1805 Dirikis, provisional designation , is a stony Themistian asteroid from the outer region of the asteroid belt, approximately 26 kilometers in diameter.

It was discovered on 1 April 1970, by Russian astronomer Lyudmila Chernykh at the Crimean Astrophysical Observatory in Nauchnyj on the Crimean peninsula. It was named for Latvian astronomer Matiss Dirikis.

Orbit and classification 

The S-type asteroid is a member of the Themis family, a dynamical population of outer-belt asteroids with nearly coplanar ecliptical orbits. It orbits the Sun at a distance of 2.8–3.5 AU once every 5 years and 7 months (2,034 days). Its orbit has an eccentricity of 0.11 and an inclination of 3° with respect to the ecliptic.

It was first observed at the Finnish Turku Observatory during WWII in 1942.

Physical characteristics

Rotation period 

A rotational lightcurve of Dirikis was obtained from photometric observations taken by French amateur astronomer René Roy In April 2003. It gave a rotation period of 23.0 hours with a brightness variation of 0.45 magnitude. A 2013-published period of 23.45 hours was derived in an international study.

Diameter and albedo 

According to the surveys carried out by the Infrared Astronomical Satellite IRAS, the Japanese Akari satellite, and NASA's Wide-field Infrared Survey Explorer with its subsequent NEOWISE mission, Dirikis measures between 22.05 and 28.10 kilometers in diameter, and its surface has an albedo between 0.089 and 0.145. The Collaborative Asteroid Lightcurve Link derives an albedo of 0.075 and calculates a diameter of 25.53 kilometers with an absolute magnitude of 11.4.

Naming 

This minor planet was named for astronomer Matiss A. Dirikis (1923–1993), who was a member of the Astronomical Observatory at the University of Latvia, and chairman of the Latvian branch of the Astronomical–Geodetical Society of the U.S.S.R.. His work on the motion of small Solar System bodies also contributed to the field of theoretical astronomy. The official  was published by the Minor Planet Center on 1 January 1974.

References

External links 
 Asteroid Lightcurve Database (LCDB), query form (info )
 Dictionary of Minor Planet Names, Google books
 Asteroids and comets rotation curves, CdR – Observatoire de Genève, Raoul Behrend
 Discovery Circumstances: Numbered Minor Planets (1)-(5000) – Minor Planet Center
 
 

 

001805
Discoveries by Lyudmila Chernykh
Named minor planets
19700401